Georgie Prespakis (born 13 March 2003) is an Australian rules footballer playing for Geelong Football Club in the AFL Women's (AFLW).

Early life 

Prespakis is the daughter of Damien and Jody. Her mother is an Indigenous Australian from the Djadjawurrung tribe. Prespakis has three siblings: twins Annalea and Madison, and Jimmy. Older sister Madison currently plays for Essendon.

She played junior football with the boys in Romsey, crossing to Sunbury to play in the under-18 girls' competition. Picked up by the Calder Cannons development program, she took out the competition's best and fairest in 2019. Prespakis won her second best and fairest award in 2021, scoring seven best-on-ground votes in just nine appearances for the Cannons.

AFL Women's career 

 recruited Prespakis with their first selection and second overall in the 2021 AFL Women's draft. She made her AFL Women's debut in the opening round of the 2022 season against  at Arden Street Oval, a game in which she was nominated for the 2022 AFL Women's Rising Star award. In March, Prespakis was included in the 40-player squad for the AFL Players Association 22under22 team, and was named on the wing in the final 22under22 team.

At the AFL Women's awards following the conclusion of AFL Women's season seven, Prespakis was again named to the wing in the AFL Players Association 22 Under 22 team, as well as receiving her first AFL Women's All-Australian team selection. Prespakis was also a top-10 finisher in the AFL Women's season seven best and fairest, but she would have been ineligible to win the award after being suspended by the AFL Tribunal during the home-and-away season.

At the Geelong Cats Best and Fairest Awards for Season 7, Georgie finished runner up behind 3x winner Amy McDonald, only 4 points behind in her second season. She was voted the Cats Fans MVP and won a new award named the Grit award, where "Cats players voted each week on who they believed showed the most ‘grit’ during games, throughout acts such as tackles, smothers, intercepts, gut running and pressure acts."

Statistics
 Statistics are correct to the end of AFL Women's season seven.

|-
! scope="row" style="text-align:center" | 2022
| style="text-align:center;"|
| 41 || 10 || 0 || 2 || 70 || 63 || 133 || 6 || 68 || 0.0 || 0.2 || 7.0 || 6.3 || 13.3 || 0.6 || 6.8 || 1
|- 
! scope="row" style="text-align:center" | S7 (2022)
| style="text-align:center;"|
| 41 || 9 || 2 || 2 || 105 || 91 || 196 || 17 || 65 || 0.2 || 0.2 || 11.7 || 10.1 || 21.8 || 1.9 || 7.2 || 15
|- 
|- class=sortbottom
! colspan=3 | Career
! 19 !! 2 !! 4 !! 175 !! 154 !! 329 !! 23 !! 133 !! 0.1 !! 0.2 !! 9.2 !! 8.1 !! 17.3 !! 1.2 !! 7.0 !!  16

|}

References

External links
 
 
 

2003 births
Living people
Indigenous Australian players of Australian rules football
Australian rules footballers from Victoria (Australia)
Calder Cannons players
Geelong Football Club (AFLW) players
Calder Cannons players (NAB League Girls)
Australian people of Greek descent